Events in the year 1891 in Chile.

Incumbents
President: Jose Manuel Balmaceda until August, Jorge Montt after August

Events
January 18-September 16 - Chilean Civil War of 1891
March 6 - Battle of Pozo Almonte
April 23 - Battle of Caldera Bay
May 6 - Itata Incident: the steamer Itata is detained in San Diego on orders of United States State Department official John W. Foster
May 7 - Itata Incident: The Itata leaves San Diego for Chile
May 16 - Itata Incident: USS Charleston, a warship sent after the Itata, arrives in the Mexican port of Acapulco without finding the Itata 
June 4 - United States Navy admiral George Brown convinces the Congressionalist Junta to give up the Itata.
July 3 - The vessel Maipo arrived in Iquique with arms and munitions for the Congressionalist Junta
August 21 - Battle of Concón
August 28 - Battle of Placilla

Births

Deaths
August 28 - Orozimbo Barbosa (born 1838)
September 19 - Jose Manuel Balmaceda, President of Chile (born 1840)

References

 
Years of the 19th century in Chile
Chile